Offa's Dyke Path  is a long-distance footpath loosely following the Wales–England border. Officially opened on 10 July 1971, by Lord Hunt, it is one of Britain's National Trails and draws walkers from throughout the world. About  of the  route either follows, or keeps close company with, the remnants of Offa's Dyke, an earthwork traditionally thought to have been constructed in the late 8th century on the orders of King Offa of Mercia.

Walking trail 

Traveling south to north, starting by the Severn Estuary at Sedbury, near Chepstow, and finishing at Prestatyn on the north coast, the walk will take an average walker roughly 12 days to complete. Roughly following the border in parts, and elsewhere the ancient monument of Offa's Dyke, as well as natural features such as the Hatterrall Ridge, the Dyke Path passes through a variety of landscapes. The route traces the eastern edge of the Black Mountains, traverses Clun Forest, the Eglwyseg moors north of Llangollen and the Clwydian Range.

The route passes through the counties of Monmouthshire, Gloucestershire, Powys, Herefordshire, Shropshire, Wrexham, Denbighshire and Flintshire. The Welsh Marches (Marchia Wallie) is a term used to describe this border region between England and Wales, since it was recorded in the Domesday Book in 1086. It passes through, or close to, the towns of Chepstow, Monmouth, Hay-on-Wye, Kington, Presteigne, Knighton, Montgomery, Welshpool and Oswestry, then in and around the North Wales towns and villages of Llangollen, Llandegla, Bodfari and Dyserth.

The half-way point of the path is marked by the Offa's Dyke Centre in Knighton.  There used to be around 600 stiles along the route, but many of these have now been replaced by kissing gates.

Route 
Places on the route and highlights on or near the trail:

Chepstow to Monmouth 
Sedbury Cliffs: Severn Estuary, Severn Bridge
Chepstow: Chepstow Castle, River Wye
 View of Tintern Abbey from the Devil's Pulpit
Redbrook: Iron railway bridge
The Kymin naval temple

Monmouth to Hay-on-Wye 
Monmouth: Monnow Bridge
White Castle
Llangattock Lingoed: St Cadoc's church
Pandy
Hatterrall Ridge is the highest point on the trail at 
Black Mountains

Llanthony Priory

Hay-on-Wye to Knighton 
Hay-on-Wye
Newchurch
Gladestry
Hergest Ridge with wild ponies, 
Kington
 Hawthorn Hill,

Knighton to Montgomery 
Knighton: Offa's Dyke visitor centre
 Panpunton Hill, 
 Cwm-Sanaham Hill 
 Llanfair Hill, highest point of the dyke at 
 Churchtown and Edenhope Hill

Montgomery to Llanymynech 
Montgomery
Chirbury
Beacon Ring Iron Age hill fort (Caer Digoll)
Buttington
 Alongside Montgomery Canal and dyke beside River Severn
Four Crosses

Llanymynech to Trevor 
Llanymynech
 Moelydd, 
Trefonen
 Oswestry old racecourse at Racecourse Common
 Craignant
Chirk Castle
Llangollen Canal
Pontcysyllte Aqueduct (World Heritage Site) over the River Dee

Trevor to Prestatyn 
Trevor
Llangollen Castle
Eglwyseg Crags
Llandegla Forest (with mountain bike trails)
Llandegla
Clwydian Range of hills:
Around Moel-y-Plas, Moel Llanfair, Moel Gyw,  and Foel Fenlli, 
Moel Famau,  and Jubilee Tower at summit
Around Moel Dywyll, Moel Llys-y-Coed,  and Moel Arthur, 
Penycloddiau hill fort at 
Bodfari
Rhuallt
Prestatyn: Offa's Dyke Monument on the beach

Promotion and media
Various bodies on either side of the border are collaborating on a sustainable tourism partnership, a principal focus of which is Walking with Offa, both on the trail but also in what has been dubbed Offa's Country i.e. in a corridor along the border.

The path was the focus of an episode of the Channel 4 program Britain's Ancient Tracks with Tony Robinson.

In June 2021, during the footpath's 50th year, an Offa's Dyke Rescue Fund was launched to restore eroded and other damaged parts of the route and to buy parts of the path at risk of sustained damage or negligence from local land owners. The fund is working in consultation with CADW and English Heritage and the National Trail Unit.

On 22 August 2021 BBC's Countryfile programme celebrated 50 years of the path.

References

External links

The Offa's Dyke Association
Offa's Dyke Path on the National Trail website
Offa's Dyke Path National Trail - Long Distance Walkers Association
Rambers' Association: Offa's Dyke Path National Trail
 Map of the Offa's Dyke Path in 2 mile sections

Long-distance footpaths in the United Kingdom
Recreational walks in Wales
Footpaths in Shropshire
Footpaths in Herefordshire
Long-distance footpaths in Wales
Footpaths in Powys
Long-distance footpaths in England
England–Wales border